Corvisart is an elevated station of the Paris Métro serving line 6 at the intersection of the Rue du Corvisart and the Boulevard Auguste Blanqui in the 13th arrondissement.

Location
The station is located above ground in the middle of Boulevard Auguste-Blanqui to the east of the intersection with Rue Corvisart.

History
 The station opened as part of the former Line 2 South on 24 April 1906, when it was extended from Passy to Place d'Italie. On 14 October 1907 Line 2 South was incorporated into Line 5. It was incorporated into line 6 on 12 October 1942. It is named after the Rue Corvisart, which commemorates Jean Nicolas des Marels, Baron Corvisart (1755–1821), who was an important figure in the history of French medicine, specialising in the lungs and the heart, and the personal doctor of Napoleon. Nearby was the location of the Barrière de Croulebarbe, a gate built for the collection of taxation as part of the Wall of the Farmers-General; the gate was built between 1784 and 1788 and demolished in the nineteenth century.

In 2018, 2,819,792 travelers entered this station, which places it at the 201st position of metro stations for its attendance.

Passenger services

Access
The station has two entrances located on the central reservation of Boulevard Auguste-Blanqui, one of which overlooks the no. 57 and the other side at no. 50.

Station layout

Bus connections
The station is served by Lines 57, 64 and 67 of the RATP Bus Network.

Nearby
The station is near the Butte-aux-Cailles neighbourhood and the École nationale supérieure des télécommunications.

References

Roland, Gérard (2003). Stations de métro. D’Abbesses à Wagram. Éditions Bonneton.

Paris Métro stations in the 13th arrondissement of Paris
Railway stations in France opened in 1906